In British politics, the Shadow Minister for Peace and Disarmament is a position within the opposition that deals with issues surrounding North Africa, the Middle East, North Korea and policy on nuclear weapons. The incumbent is Fabian Hamilton. The position was created by Jeremy Corbyn and has no equivalent in His Majesty's Government.

List of Shadow Ministers for Peace and Disarmament

References

Official Opposition (United Kingdom)